Quiz TV was a popular British television interactive gameshow which screened on Digital satellite and cable TV from 14 June 2004 to 23 June 2006. It was a premium-line call-in show, viewers were encouraged to phone a premium-rate number in order to provide an answer to a quiz question.

Quiz channels in the United Kingdom
Defunct television channels in the United Kingdom
Phone-in quiz shows